The 1917 Northwestern Purple team represented Northwestern University during the 1917 college football season. In their fourth year under head coach Fred J. Murphy, the Purple compiled a 5–2 record (3–2 against Big Ten Conference opponents) and finished in a tie for third place in the Big Ten Conference.

Schedule

References

Northwestern
Northwestern Wildcats football seasons
Northwestern Purple football